Birakan is an urban locality (an urban-type settlement) in Obluchensky District of the Jewish Autonomous Oblast, Russia. Population:

References

Urban-type settlements in the Jewish Autonomous Oblast